The Udokan mine is a large copper mine located in the south of Russia in Zabaykalsky Krai, around 30 km south of the town of Novaya Chara on the Baikal Amur Mainline. 

The mine is part of the Udokan Ore Region that includes the Udokan, Kalar and Kodar ranges. The Udokan Ore Region represents the largest copper deposit in Russia and third largest in the world, having estimated reserves of 1.2 billion tonnes of ore grading 2% copper.

References 

Copper mines in Russia
Mines in the Soviet Union